Atelopus quimbaya is a species of toad in the family Bufonidae. It is endemic to Colombia and known from the western slopes of the Cordillera Central in Risaralda, Quindío, and Caldas Departments. Chytridiomycosis is a serious risk to this rare species.

References

quimbaya
Amphibians of the Andes
Amphibians of Colombia
Endemic fauna of Colombia
Amphibians described in 1994
Taxonomy articles created by Polbot